New Rising Star Baptist Church is a historic church at 3104 33rd Place N, Collegeville in Birmingham, Alabama.  It was built in 1958 and added to the National Register of Historic Places in 2005.

References

Baptist churches in Alabama
Churches on the National Register of Historic Places in Alabama
National Register of Historic Places in Birmingham, Alabama
Churches completed in 1958
Churches in Birmingham, Alabama